Michael Caine (born 1933) is a British film actor.

Michael Caine may also refer to:

 Michael Caine (racing driver) (born 1969), British auto racing driver
 Michael Harris Caine (1927–1999), British businessman
 "Michael Caine" (song), a song by Madness

See also
 Michael Caines, English chef
 Michael Cain, American musician
 Michael Cain (footballer), British footballer